Kamal Mondal (born 4 October 1982) is an Indian former cricketer. He played six first-class matches for Bengal between 2006 and 2007.

See also
 List of Bengal cricketers

References

External links
 

1982 births
Living people
Indian cricketers
Bengal cricketers
People from Nadia district